Croatia competed at the 2020 Winter Youth Olympics in Lausanne, Switzerland from 9 to 22 January 2020.

Medalists
Medals awarded to participants of mixed-NOC teams are represented in italics. These medals are not counted towards the individual NOC medal tally.

Alpine skiing

Boys

Biathlon

Boys

Girls

Mixed

Bobsleigh

Cross-country skiing 

Boys

Girls

Ice hockey

Mixed NOC 3x3 tournament

Short track speed skating

Boys

Girls

See also
Croatia at the 2020 Summer Olympics

References

2020 in Croatian sport
Nations at the 2020 Winter Youth Olympics
Croatia at the Youth Olympics